The 2021 North Dakota Fighting Hawks football team represented the University of North Dakota in the 2021 NCAA Division I FCS football season. The Fighting Hawks competed as members of the Missouri Valley Football Conference and were led by eight-year head coach Bubba Schweigert. They played their home games at Alerus Center in Grand Forks, North Dakota.

The Fighting Hawks finished the season 5–6, 3–5 in MVFC play to finish in eighth place.

Previous season 
In a season delayed until February 2021 due to the ongoing COVID-19 pandemic, the Hawks finished the 2020–21 season 5–2, 4–1 in MVFC play to finish in second place. With three games canceled due to COVID-19, the Hawks received a bid to the FCS Playoffs where they defeated No. 12 Missouri State in the first round before losing to No. 1-seeded James Madison.

Schedule

References

North Dakota
North Dakota Fighting Hawks football seasons
North Dakota Fighting Hawks football